Red Red Meat is the eponymously titled debut studio album of Red Red Meat, released in 1992 by Perishable Records.

Track listing

Vinyl Reissue Jealous Butcher Bonus Tracks Cat. No. JB127 RELEASE DATE 11/06/2015

Personnel
Adapted from the Red Red Meat liner notes.

Red Red Meat
 Brian Deck – drums
 Glenn Girard – effects, guitar
 Glynis Johnson – bass guitar, vocals
 Tim Rutili – guitar, vocals

Additional musicians
 Jimmy Chamberlin – drums (1)
 Ben Massarella – drums (3, 7, 10, 13)

Release history

References

External links 
 

1992 debut albums
Red Red Meat albums